The dusky-throated antshrike (Thamnomanes ardesiacus) is a species of bird in the family Thamnophilidae. It is found in Bolivia, Brazil, Colombia, Ecuador, French Guiana, Guyana, Peru, Suriname, and Venezuela. Its natural habitat is subtropical or tropical moist lowland forests.

The dusky-throated antshrike was described by the English ornithologists Philip Sclater and Osbert Salvin in 1868 and given the binomial name Dysithamnus ardesiacus.

References

dusky-throated antshrike
Birds of the Bolivian Amazon
Birds of the Colombian Amazon
Birds of the Ecuadorian Amazon
Birds of the Peruvian Amazon
Birds of the Venezuelan Amazon
Birds of the Guianas
dusky-throated antshrike
dusky-throated antshrike
dusky-throated antshrike
Taxonomy articles created by Polbot